"Break My Fall" is a single track by Tiësto with vocals from BT released in July 2007. This song is off the album Elements of Life.

Music video
The music video for the song features BT and Ashley Duffy, who is BT’s ex wife. Duffy was accused of abducting his daughter over a child custody dispute in December 2007 and was jailed in California when the child was found one month later.

Formats and track listings

Release history

Charts

Lyrics
 The title for the song is mentioned on the lyrics of "Shame" by BT from his album Movement in Still Life.
 "Dynamic symmetry combine" is from one of the verses. "Dynamic Symmetry" is the name of a track on BT's 2006 album This Binary Universe.

References

2007 songs
2007 singles
Tiësto songs
BT (musician) songs
Songs written by Tiësto